Cromwell with the Coffin of Charles I is a partially-varnished c. 1831 watercolour by Eugène Delacroix, now in the 	
Département des Arts graphiques of the Louvre in Paris.

Production
The work was painted as a reaction against Paul Delaroche's Cromwell and Charles I, exhibited at the 1831 Paris Salon, the first to be held after the July Revolution and Louis-Philippe I's seizure of power - Delacroix's own Liberty Leading the People had been exhibited at the same Salon. Both works are based on a fictional account by François-René de Chateaubriand of Oliver Cromwell opening Charles I's coffin after the latter's execution. Delaroche's work was less a portrayal of an event than an oblique comment on the French Revolution and Louis XVI's execution, with Cromwell standing in for Napoleon. Besides this nostalgia for France's Ancien Régime, Delaroche was attempting to find a middle way between Ingres' neoclassicism and Delacroix's romanticism

Delacroix was not alone in critiquing Delaroche's painting - Punch even published a parody of it in 1852 entitled Louis Napoléon Looking at the Corpse of Liberty According to a letter from Delacroix to his painter friend Paul Huet, Delacroix chose to produce the work in watercolour to express a radical opposition to Delaroche's approach. Delacroix's work imitated Delaroche's historical realism but as a small watercolour not a huge canvas. It also added Delacroix's own romanticism, which attempted to revive the past by evoking emotion. Unlike Delaroche, Delacroix preferred to imagine an evolving and troubled Cromwell on the edge of the scene not at its centre, finding the coffin by accident. It recalls the watercolour style of Delacroix's friend Richard Parkes Bonington, even down to the theatrical curtain above Charles' head. Unlike in Delaroche's work, all but Charles' head is unseen, recalling his beheading.

Delaroche ignored the criticism of his work and showed Cromwell again in his Charles I Insulted by Cromwell's Soldiers in 1836, which was so strongly savaged by the critics that Delaroche never exhibited at the Paris Salon again and barely exhibited outside it either. After its return to France it was assigned to the Louvre.

References

Bibliography
  L’Invention du Passé. Histoires de cœur et d’épée en Europe 1802-1850, t. 2, Paris, Musée des Beaux-Arts de Lyon ; Hazan, 2014, 320 p. (notice BnF no FRBNF43829187).
 Michael J. Braddick, The Oxford Handbook of the English Revolution, OUP Oxford, 2015, 640 p.,.
  Alain Daguerre de Hureaux, Delacroix, Paris, Hazan, 1993, 365 p..
  Barthélémy Jobert, Delacroix, Paris, Gallimard, coll. « Monographie », 1997, 335 p. (notice BnF no FRBNF36190301).
 Mary Lathers, Encyclopedia of the Romantic Era, 1760-1850, Christopher John Murray éd., New York, Routledge, 2013, 1336 p.,.
 Martin Meisel, Realizations : Narrative, Pictorial, and Theatrical Arts in Nineteenth-Century England, Princeton, Princeton University Press, 2014, 492 p.,.
 Susanne Zantop, Paintings on the move, Lincoln, University of Nebraska Press, 1989, 194 p.,.
 Stephen Bann, Paul Delaroche : History Painted, Princeton, Princeton University Press, 1997, 304 p..
  Alfred Robaut ; Fernand Calmettes ; Ernest Chesneau, L’Œuvre complet de Eugène Delacroix,... peintures, dessins, gravures, lithographies, catalogué et reproduit par Alfred Robaut, commenté par Ernest Chesneau, ouvrage publié avec la collaboration de Fernand Calmettes, Paris, Charavay frères, 1885.

Watercolour paintings by Eugène Delacroix
Drawings of the Louvre
1831 paintings
Cultural depictions of Oliver Cromwell
Charles I of England in art
Paintings about death